Fabienne Fabrèges was a French film actress of the silent era. She appeared in more than sixty films.

Selected filmography
 Wanda Warenine (1917)
 The Penniless Millionaire (1921)
 The Little Unknown (1923)

References

Bibliography
 Abel, Richard. The Ciné Goes to Town: French Cinema, 1896-1914. University of California Press, 1998.

External links

1889 births
Year of death unknown
French film actresses
Actresses from Paris
French silent film actresses
20th-century French actresses
Women film pioneers